Quend is a commune in the Somme department in Hauts-de-France in northern France. The inhabitants are known as Quennois.

Geography
Quend is situated between the estuaries of the Somme and the Authie, with the D940 connecting to the A16 motorway. Quend is a commune of several villages and hamlets (Monchaux, Routhiauville, Quend-Plage-Les-Pins and more).

History
Quend's church is dedicated to Saint Vaast, bishop of Arras in the 6th century.
The steeple, which can be seen from miles around, was used as a triangulation point when creating the map of France. On 15 March 1905, lightning struck the steeple.

Quend-Plage-Les-Pins was razed during the Allied invasion of France in 1944.

Population

Tourism and culture
Since 2005, A film festival has taken place at Quend-Plage-les-Pins.

Places and monuments

Personalities
 Roger Noyon, artiste

See also
Communes of the Somme department

References

External links

 Quend-Plage-Les-Pins website

Communes of Somme (department)
Seaside resorts in France